Kyla Llana Magdaraog Atienza (born April 12, 1997) is a Filipina volleyball player. She currently plays for the Creamline Cool Smashers volleyball team in the Premier Volleyball League.  She was a member of the FEU Lady Tamaraws volleyball team in both indoor and beach volleyball. She impressed in her debut for the Philippine team by keeping the ball alive for most of Vietnam's attacks at the AVC Cup on August 21, 2022. ASEAN Grand Prix named her Best Libero on September 11, 2022.

Clubs
  Creamline Cool Smashers (2018-present)

Awards

Individual
 2013 UAAP Season 76 Beach Volleyball "Rookie of the Year"
 2019 Premier Volleyball League Open Conference "Best Libero"
 2022 ASEAN Grand Prix "Best Libero"

Club
 2018 Premier Volleyball League Reinforced Conference –   Champions,  with Creamline Cool Smashers
 2018 Premier Volleyball League Open Conference –   Champions,  with Creamline Cool Smashers
 2019 Premier Volleyball League Reinforced Conference –   Silver medal,  with Creamline Cool Smashers
 2019 Premier Volleyball League Open Conference –   Champions,  with Creamline Cool Smashers
 2021 Premier Volleyball League Open Conference –  Runner-up with Creamline Cool Smashers
 2022 Premier Volleyball League Open Conference –   Champions,  with Creamline Cool Smashers
 2022 Premier Volleyball League Invitational Conference –   Champions,  with Creamline Cool Smashers

 2022 Premier Volleyball League Reinforced Conference -  Bronze medal, with Creamline Cool Smashers

References

1997 births
Living people
Filipino women's volleyball players
University Athletic Association of the Philippines volleyball players
21st-century Filipino women
Philippines women's international volleyball players
Liberos